John Edward Merricks (16 February 1971 – 15 October 1997) was an English sailor. He represented Great Britain at the 1996 Summer Olympics in Atlanta, where he received the silver medal in the 470 class along with his sailing partner, Ian Walker.

At the 1996 470 European Championships he and Walker won the silver medal.

Merricks died in a car accident in Italy on 15 October 1997. He and Walker were passengers in a minivan when the driver lost control.  A lake at Watermead Park is named after him.

References

External links
 
 
 

1971 births
1997 deaths
Sportspeople from Leicester
Olympic sailors of Great Britain
English male sailors (sport)
Sailors at the 1996 Summer Olympics – 470
Olympic silver medallists for Great Britain
Road incident deaths in Italy
Olympic medalists in sailing
470 class sailors
Medalists at the 1996 Summer Olympics
420 class world champions
World champions in sailing for Great Britain